Clive Oppenheimer (born 1964) is a British volcanologist, and Professor of Volcanology in the Department of Geography of the University of Cambridge.

Education
Oppenheimer studied the Natural Sciences Tripos at the University of Cambridge where he was awarded a Bachelor of Arts degree in 1986.He has a PhD from the Open University, his thesis investigated the use of remote sensing in volcanology and was supervised by Peter Francis and David Rothery.

Career and research
Oppenheimer's research interests are in volcanology and geochemistry, particularly in Antarctica. He has spent 13 seasons doing field work on Mount Erebus in Antarctica. In addition to his volcanological work he discovered two previously lost campsites used by a group of explorers from Scott's Terra Nova expedition in 1912, now recognised as protected sites under the Antarctic Treaty System.

In 2011, the Government of North Korea invited him, his PhD student Kayla Iacovino, and volcanologist James Hammond of Imperial College, London to study the Baekdu Mountain for recent volcanic activity. Their project was continuing in 2014 and expected to last for another "two or three years".

He is a member of the Cambridge Volcanology unit.

Media appearances
Oppenheimer appeared in Werner Herzog's documentary Encounters at the End of the World and is featured in the 2016 Werner Herzog documentary, Into the Inferno.  He appeared on BBC Radio 4's The Museum of Curiosity. His hypothetical donation to this imaginary museum was a small tin of magma. He has also appeared on The Infinite Monkey Cage alongside Jo Brand and Tamsin Mather and The Museum of Curiosity, Midweek and In Our Time on BBC Radio 4.

Awards and honours
In 2005 he was awarded the Murchison Award by the Royal Geographical Society “for publications judged to contribute most to geographical science in preceding recent years”.

Selected publications
His publications include Eruptions that Shook the World which formed the basis of the 2016 film Into the Inferno directed by Werner Herzog.

Eruptions that Shook the World 
Volcanoes by Peter Francis and Clive Oppenheimer
Volcanism and the Earth's Atmosphere 
Volcanic Degassing

References

Living people
Alumni of the University of Cambridge
Alumni of the Open University
British volcanologists
Volcanologists
21st-century British geologists
1964 births